The Jones Party was a political party in Malta.

History
The party was established in 1945 in Gozo. It won two seats in the 1947 elections, but lost both in the 1950 elections. After failing to win a seat in the 1951 elections it subsequently disappeared.

Ideology
The party sought to promote agricultural co-operatives, and opposed Malta's dominance within the island group.

References

Defunct political parties in Malta
Political parties established in 1945
Gozo
1945 establishments in Malta